The Norfolk Heritage Fleet Trust is a waterway society and charitable trust based at Hunter's Yard, Ludham on the Norfolk Broads, England, UK. The Trust maintains and hires out a fleet of wooden sailing yachts from the 1930s.

Hunter's Yard is situated in its own dyke off Womack Water on the Norfolk Broads in which the two original boat sheds (the first being built in 1932 and the second in 1935) are mostly as they were built in the 1930s, from timber in the traditional Broads' style, with many of its original features intact and numerous pieces of equipment, tools and boat fittings on view to the public.

History

Hunter's Yard was operational until 1968 when it was sold to the Norfolk County Council and was renamed Norfolk County Sailing Base. The Council maintained the traditions of the Yard, however its main aim was to encourage young people to sail and experience the Yachts and discounts were offered to schools. In 1995 the Council decided to sell the Yard and its fleet as part of an economy measure. Subsequently a fundraising effort was carried out to retain the yard which raised £100,000 from public sources and £200,000 from the Heritage Lottery Fund. In 1996 the Norfolk Heritage Fleet Trust was established and took over the yard, continuing to encourage young people to use and sail on the yachts, as well as hiring them out for public use.

Cabin yachts

The trust maintain a number of yachts of various types:

Hustler class – sloop-rigged, with 2 berths

The trust have five Hustler-class yachts, all built between 1935 and 1938: numbers I, II, III, IV & V.

Rig: gaff sloop with self-tacking jib
Mast lowing: counter weights
Length: LOA 24 ft
Beam: 7 ft 6 in
Draught: 2 ft 6in
Bridge clearance: Minimum 5 ft 11in
Headroom: 5 ft 9in with top raised (aft end)

Wood class – sloop-rigged, Carvel-built with 3 berths

The trust have five Wood Class yachts: Wood Anenome (1947), Wood Avens (1949), Wood Rose (1934), Wood Sorrel (1933) and Wood Violet (1934).

Rig: gaff sloop with self-tacking Jib
Mast lowing: counter weights
Length: LOA 24 ft
Beam: 7 ft 6 in
Draught: 2 ft 6in
Bridge clearance: minimum 5 ft 11in
Headroom: 5 ft 9in with top raised (aft end)

Lullaby class – sloop-rigged, Carvel-built of mahogany with 4 berths

The trust have four Lullaby-class yachts: Lullaby (1932), Lustre (1932), Luna (1933) and Lucent (2007):

Rig: gaff sloop with self-tacking Jib
Mast lowing: counter weights
Length: LOA 28 ft
Beam: 8 ft 6 in
Draught: 2 ft 6in
Bridge clearance: Minimum 6 ft
Headroom: 5 ft 9in with top raised (aft end)

Half deckers

The trust also owns a number of half-decker day boats:

Buff tip – also known as a White Boat
Gunter rig
Main sail and jib, LOA, 20 foot

Sundew – a Waveney One Design.
Gunter rig
Main sail and jib, LOA 20 ft

Rebel Reveller – high-performance sailing yacht
Gunter rig
Main sail and jib, LOA 20 ft 9 inches

Brown Bess – suitable for sailing alone
Single, balanced lug sail, LOA 20 ft

Woodcuts – there are two of these yachts, I & II
Single, semi-salanced lug sail, LOA 18 ft

See also
List of waterway societies in the United Kingdom
Norfolk Wherry Trust
Norfolk and Suffolk Boating Association
North Walsham and Dilham Canal Society
Wherry Yacht Charter Charitable Trust

References

External links
Official website
Department for Culture, Media and Sport: Ships for the Nation, Consultation on Government Policy for the Preservation of Historic Ships; mention of Norfolk Heritage Fleet Trust
Telegraph online, March 5, 2008 article: Norfolk by Boat / Flora Duncan discovers Norfolk via its network of ancient waterways
Eastern Daily Press Tourism Awards: Norfolk Heritage Fleet Trust wins the Best Water Based Tourism Experience Award 2008

Clubs and societies in Norfolk
Charities based in Norfolk
Boat types